The 22nd Robert Awards ceremony was held in 2005 in Copenhagen, Denmark. Organized by the Danish Film Academy, the awards honoured the best in Danish and foreign film of 2004.

Honorees

Best Danish Film 
 King's Game – Nikolaj Arcel

Best Children's Film 
 Terkel in Trouble – Stefan Fjeldmark, Kresten Vestbjerg Andersen & Thorbjørn Christoffersen

Best Director 
 Nikolaj Arcel – King's Game

Best Screenplay 
 Anders Thomas Jensen – Brothers (Best original screenplay)
 Nikolaj Arcel & Rasmus Heisterberg – King's Game (Best adapted screenplay)

Best Actor in a Leading Role 
 Mads Mikkelsen – Pusher II

Best Actress in a Leading Role 
 Sofie Gråbøl – Aftermath

Best Actor in a Supporting Role 
 Søren Pilmark – King's Game

Best Actress in a Supporting Role 
 Trine Dyrholm – In Your Hands

Best Cinematography 
 Rasmus Videbæk – King's Game

Best Production Design 
 Niels Sejer – King's Game

Best Costume Design 
 Helle Nielsen – King's Game

Best Makeup 
 Louise Hauberg Nielsen & Morten Jacobsen –

Best Special Effects 
 Daniel Silwerfeldt & Thomas Borch Nielsen –

Best Sound Design 
 Nalle Hansen – Terkel in Trouble

Best Editing 
 Mikkel E. G. Nielsen – King's Game

Best Score 
  - Terkel in Trouble

Best Song 
 Anders Matthesen – "Paranoia" – Terkel in Trouble

Non-American Film 
 Evil – Mikael Håfström

Best American Film 
 Lost in Translation – Sofia Coppola

Best Documentary Short 
 Biernes by – Laila Hodell & Bertel Torne

Best Documentary Feature 
 The Swenkas – Jeppe Rønde

Best Short Featurette 
 This Is Me Walking – Ulrik Wivel

Audience Award 
 Terkel in Trouble

Special Jury Prize (Short) 
 Max Kestner – Nede på jorden

See also 

 2005 Bodil Awards

References

External links 
  

2004 film awards
Robert Awards ceremonies
2005 in Copenhagen